The 2010 Challenge Cup Final was the 109th cup-deciding game of the rugby league 2010 Challenge Cup Season. It was held at Wembley Stadium in London on 28 August 2010, kick off 14:30. The final was contested by Leeds Rhinos and Warrington Wolves. The game saw Warrington beat Leeds by 30 points to 6.

Route to the final

Leeds Rhinos
Leeds Rhinos were drawn Super League side Hull F.C. in the fourth round, winning the match and progressing to beat third tier side Blackpool Panthers in what would be their final year of existence. The quarter finals saw the Rhinos beat eventual league champions who they had previously lost to both times in the league. The semi-finals also saw Leeds beat St Helens who came second in this season's league.

Warrington Wolves
Warrington Wolves were draw Championship side Featherstone Rovers in the fourth round, progressing to thrash Huddersfield Giants in the fifth round. Warrington faced Bradford Bulls in the quarter finals, winning by four points, before another comfortable victory over bottom of the league Catalans Dragons.

Pre-match
This game marked the second time these sides had faced each other in the Challenge Cup Final after the 1935–36 edition where Leeds Rhinos won 18–2. At 12:35 the Schools Champions Final between Dowdales School in Dalton-in-Furness and Temple Moor High School in Leeds would occur before the main event. English singer Camilla Kerslake would also perform before the final, having previously performed at the League Cup Final earlier in the year. She sung her own music as well as The National Anthem and Abide with Me, the official anthem of the Challenge Cup and FA Cup Final.

Match details

Post match

Following the match, the RFL announced the game was the first sell out Challenge Cup Final since it return to the new Wembley Stadium following the stadium completion in 2007.

References

2010 in English rugby league
Challenge Cup finals
Leeds Rhinos matches
Warrington Wolves matches
August 2010 sports events in the United Kingdom
2010 sports events in London